Clinton Fernandes (born 1971) is an Australian historian and academic who is professor of international and political studies at the University of New South Wales in Canberra, Australia, part of the Australian Defence Force Academy. His work is primarily concerned with Australia’s national security, in particular intelligence matters and Australia's relations with its Southeast Asian neighbours.

Education
Fernandes completed his thesis at Deakin University in 2004, entitled A Transformational Analysis of the National Interest, which argued that the Australian Government was forced by public outrage to support the Independence of East Timor.

Intelligence career
Fernandes served in the military during his twenties when he was seconded to the Australian Army Intelligence Corps (AUSTINT) as a case officer on the Indonesian desk. In the lead up to the Independence of East Timor and during the International Force for East Timor (INTERFET), Fernandes and Lance Collins become embroiled in an intelligence leak scandal.

Fernandes and Collins wrote a report contradicting the assessment of the Defence Intelligence Organisation (DIO), which had not acknowledged a change in circumstances. Both officers believed that conditions were ripe for a UN backed peacekeeping mission. However, the Jakarta lobby – a powerful de facto group within the apparatus of Australian government that believed Indonesia must be placated – as well as the Australian Department of Defence became increasingly concerned with their contradictory assessment. The DIO liaison in Washington, Merv Jenkins, who was under pressure from within DIO to conceal intelligence information, provided US agencies with that intelligence believing it was within his authority. The prospect of significant disciplinary proceedings and an end to his career caused Jenkins to commit suicide on his birthday.

The Indonesian government began violently suppressing Timor’s shift towards independence, public pressure became insurmountable. The Howard Government gave in and Major General Peter Cosgrove announced the new approach. Collins became a key advisor. During his tenure he became increasingly concerned with the violence of Indonesian forces, worrying the Jakarta lobby. Some communications between Australian intelligence and INTERFET forces were disconnected for some 24 hours,  but this did not place  these forces at risk. Collins, believing this to be a personal warning, called for a royal commission into the disconnection.

Major intelligence leaks revealing the extent of the Howard Government's knowledge in the buildup to the Independence of East Timor emerged in 2000, including their knowledge of Indonesian violence towards Timorese. The homes of Fernandes and Collins were raided by the Australian Federal Police, with Fernandes receiving a 12-month suspension and Collins being publicly outed as the apparent source of the leak. Yet, no charges were formally laid. Fernandes was eventually cleared of wrongdoing and promoted to the rank of major.

An external investigation was launched which found that the Jakarta lobby existed within DIO, thus verifying the concerns of Fernandes and Collins. The author of this report, Captain Martin Toohey, was publicly ridiculed by the Howard Government and subject to investigation. The Inspector-General of Intelligence and Security and a Senate Estimates Committee publicly affirmed the veracity of Toohey’s report in 2005. No further action was taken upon being referred to the Australian Minister for Defence.

Academic career
Fernandes' academic career at the UNSW at ADFA has been primarily focused on intelligence matters and Australian’s relations with Southeast Asia, particularly Indonesia and Timor Leste. Since 2007 he has undertaken an exhaustive effort to challenge a decision by the Australian Government to block the release of documents in National Archives of Australia that would demonstrate Australia's knowledge of violence perpetrated against the Timorese in the early 1980s. His efforts were stifled by significant delays and vague arguments on the part of successive governments to deny the release of documents beyond the 30 year rule because it would allegedly damage Australia's relations with Indonesia in the present time.

Fernandes was embroiled in an intellectual dispute with Associate Professor Philip Mendes, from Monash University Faculty of Medicine, in 2005. Mendes responded to an article Fernandes had written about Noam Chomsky in Overland magazine, arguing Fernandes had overlooked the implicit anti-Semitism of Chomsky's notorious involvement in the Faurisson affair, when he said that deniers of the Holocaust were not necessarily anti-Semitic for that reason alone. Responding in the same edition, Fernandes quoted Chomsky to argue that Chomsky's argument was often misunderstood and to highlight what Fernandes saw as Mendes' bias:

Fernandes has also written a book about Chomsky, whom he has met, entitled Peace with Justice: Noam Chomsky in Australia. A review of academic Robert Manne's years as editor of Quadrant magazine, 1989-1997, written by Fernandes, attacked the academic's timidity in addressing the complicity of successive Australian governments with the Indonesian regime in East Timor. This review later received comment on the ABC:

In 2016, the National Library of Australia awarded Fernandes a fellowship for his work, The bi-partisan consensus in Australian foreign policy, 1983.

Activism
In 2009, Fernandes acted as the historical consultant for the film Balibo based on the 1975 events surrounding the murders of the Balibo Five and Roger East. Although the film credits Jill Jolliffe’s book ‘’Cover-Up’’ as the basis for the script, Fernandes undertook significant rewrites in order to maintain historical accuracy and refocus on events that occurred in East Timor instead of Australia.

Fernandes has undertaken extensive work with various Australian politicians. For example, he has often pursued issues with Senator Nick Xenophon, who is leader of NXT in the Australian Senate. Writing in the Sydney Morning Herald on the 40th anniversary of the Balibo Five murders, Fernandes and Xenophon outlined Australia's history of complicity with Indonesia:

Fernandes also co-authored a submission to the Independent National Security Legislation Monitor regarding the suppression of investigative journalism under legislative changes to the Australian Security Intelligence Organisation Act. Their work on this received media attention.

Published works
 Fernandes, Island Off the Coast of Asia : Instruments of Statecraft in Australian Foreign Policy (2018).
 Fernandes, ed. Peace with Justice : Noam Chomsky in Australia (2012).
 Fernandes, Independence of East Timor : Multi-Dimensional Perspectives - Occupation, Resistance, & International Political Activism (2011).
 Fernandes, ed. Hot Spot: Asian and Oceania (2008).
 Fernandes, Reluctant Indonesians : Australia, Indonesia and the future of West Papua (2006).
 Fernandes, Reluctant Saviour : Australia, Indonesia and the Liberation of East Timor (2005).

References

External links
 East Timor companion 
 Balibo (film) companion   

Living people
Academic staff of the University of New South Wales
Australian political scientists
Australian political writers
1971 births
Deakin University alumni